Carl E. Schaefer is a United States Air Force lieutenant general currently serving as the deputy commander of the Air Force Materiel Command. Prior to that, he commanded the 412th Test Wing.

Awards and decorations

Effective dates of promotions

References

|-

Lieutenant generals
Living people
Place of birth missing (living people)
Recipients of the Legion of Merit
United States Air Force generals
Year of birth missing (living people)